Light in Your Mind is the third studio album by Cymbals, released on August 25, 2017, through Tough Love Records. It is the first album recorded by the band since the departure of founding band members Luke Carson and Neil Gillespie. The album was produced by Capitol K.

Reception

Light in Your Mind was well-received by contemporary music critics upon its initial release. In a four-and-a-half star out of five review for AllMusic, writer Matt Collar found that the albums was "sanguine, deeply emotive, yet often brightly colored affair that reflects the turmoil and personal struggles the band went through prior to its recording."

Track listing

Personnel
Adapted from AllMusic.

Cymbals
Jack Cleverly – bass, electronic drums, guitar, piano, synthesizer, vocals
Dan Simons – Piano, programming, synthesizer, viola

Additional Musicians
Alabaster DePlume – saxophone
Justin Goings – drums
Josh Heffernan – drums
Kristian Craig Robinson – electronic drums, programming, synthesizer bass

Technical
Capitol K – engineer, producer
Jorge Elbrecht – mixing
Emily Graham – photography
Stephen Quinns – mastering
Matthew Walkerdine – design

References

2017 albums